Qiawan  is a town-level administrative unit under the jurisdiction of Nanfeng County, Fuzhou City, Jiangxi Province, People's Republic of China.  As of 2017, it has 11 villages under its administration.

Administrative Divisions 
Qiawan has jurisdiction over the following areas:

Qiawan Village, Shangdian Village, Huangjia Village, Likeng Village, Upstream Village, Huangfang Village, Xiping Village, Shijie Village, Changling Village, Taoyuan Village and Jiajin Village.

References 

Township-level divisions of Jiangxi
Nanfeng County